Güngörmez is a village in the District of Iğdır, Iğdır Province, in eastern Turkey. In 2019 it had a population of 279.

Geography
The village lies to the southeast of Tuzluca,  by road southwest of the district capital of Iğdır.

References

Villages in Iğdır Province

Iğdır Central District
Towns in Turkey
Populated places in Iğdır Province